The 2012–13 Middle Tennessee Blue Raiders men's basketball team represented Middle Tennessee State University during the 2012–13 NCAA Division I men's basketball season. The Blue Raiders, led by 11th year head coach Kermit Davis, played their home games at the Murphy Center and were members of the East Division of the Sun Belt Conference. They finished the season 28–6, 19–1 in Sun Belt play to become Sun Belt regular season champions. They advanced to the semifinals of the Sun Belt tournament where they lost to FIU. They received an at-large bid to the 2013 NCAA tournament, their first tournament bid since 1989, where they lost in the First Four round to Saint Mary's.

This was the Blue Raiders last season as a member of the Sun Belt. In July, 2013, they will become a member of Conference USA.

Roster

Schedule

|-
!colspan=9| Exhibition

|-
!colspan=9| Regular season

|-
!colspan=9| 2013 Sun Belt tournament

|-
!colspan=9| 2013 NCAA tournament

References

Middle Tennessee Blue Raiders men's basketball seasons
Middle Tennessee
Middle Tennessee
Middle Tennessee Blue Raiders
Middle Tennessee Blue Raiders